Charles Harting Percy (September 27, 1919 – September 17, 2011) was an American businessman and politician. He was president of the Bell & Howell Corporation from 1949 to 1964, and served as a Republican U.S. senator from Illinois from 1967 until 1985, following a defeat to Paul Simon. He was mentioned as a Republican presidential hopeful from 1968 through 1988. During his Senate career, Percy concentrated on business and foreign relations.

Early life and education
Charles Harting Percy was born in Pensacola, the seat of Escambia County in far northwestern Florida, the son of Edward H. Percy and the former Elizabeth Harting. His father, an Alabama native descended from illustrious colonial-era Mississippians and Virginians, was at various times an automobile salesman and bank cashier. His Illinois-born mother was a concert violinist. Edward was a son of Charles Brown Percy and Helen Leila Herndon of the powerful Herndon family of Virginia. Elizabeth Harting was a daughter of Phineas Fredrick Harting and Belle Aschenbach.

The family moved to Chicago when Percy was an infant. As a child, he had entrepreneurial energy and held jobs while attending school. In the mid-1930s, his pluck brought him to the attention of his Sunday school teacher, Joseph McNabb, the president of Bell & Howell, then a small camera company.

Percy completed high school at New Trier High School. He entered the University of Chicago on a half tuition scholarship, and worked his way through college with several part-time jobs.  He completed his degree in economics in 1941, and was a member of the Alpha Delta Phi fraternity.

Business career
Percy started at Bell & Howell in 1938 as an apprentice and sales trainee while he was still in college.  In 1939 he worked at Crowell Collier.

He returned to Bell & Howell in 1941 to work full-time after graduating from the University of Chicago. Astute at business, within a year he was appointed a director of the company. Percy served three years in the United States Navy during World War II and returned to the company in 1945.

In 1949, the Jaycees named Percy one of the "Outstanding Young Men in America", along with Gerald R. Ford Jr., of Michigan, future U.S. president, and John Ben Shepperd, future Texas attorney general.

After Joseph McNabb died in 1949, Percy was made the president of Bell & Howell. He was instrumental in leading the company during a period of financial success and growth. During his leadership, Percy expanded Bell & Howell, raising revenues 32-fold and the number of employees 12-fold, and listing the company on the New York Stock Exchange. While continuing to manufacture movie cameras and movie and sound projectors for military, commercial, and home use, in the late 1940s the company diversified into the production of microfilm. It later entered the rapidly expanding markets of information services as well.

Political career
In the late 1950s, Percy decided to enter politics. With the encouragement of then U.S. President Dwight D. Eisenhower, Percy helped to write Decisions for a Better America, which proposed a set of long-range goals for the Republican Party. He belonged to the moderate and liberal wing of the Republican party, led by Eisenhower during his presidency and later closely identified with New York Governor Nelson A. Rockefeller. In 1958, Percy served on the Rockefeller Foundation's Special Study Fund, essentially working as an informal advisor to Rockefeller's campaign for Governor of New York.

Percy first entered electoral politics with a run for governor of Illinois in 1964, which he narrowly lost to Democratic incumbent Otto Kerner. During his gubernatorial campaign, Percy reluctantly endorsed conservative Republican presidential nominee Barry Goldwater, his future Senate colleague. Goldwater fared poorly throughout the country, although he did marginally better in Illinois than in the nation at large.

U.S. Senate
In 1966, Percy ran for U.S. senator from Illinois. His 21-year-old daughter Valerie was murdered at the family home on the morning of September 18, late in the campaign. Her death was thought to have been caused by an intruder, but the crime was never solved despite a lengthy investigation.

Percy and his opponent both suspended campaigning for a couple of weeks following Valerie's death. He upset Democratic Senator Paul Douglas (a former professor of Percy's at the University of Chicago) with 56 percent of the vote.

After Percy appeared on the television show Face The Nation on January 15, 1967, with the other newly elected Republican Senators, the then President Lyndon Johnson noted privately that he thought Percy would make a fine president if the opportunity should ever arise.

On December 12, 1967, Senator Percy met with South Vietnamese President Thieu and assured him that "no responsible people in either the Democratic or the Republican Party favored US withdrawal from South Vietnam."

In 1967, Senator Percy introduced a bill to establish a program to stimulate production of low-cost housing. Percy's proposal was the first of its kind to provide home ownership to low-income families, and it received strong support from Republicans in both the House and the Senate, although it ultimately did not pass. When asked why he selected housing for his first major legislative proposal, Percy said: "Of all the problems I ran across during three years of campaigning, first for the governorship and then for the Senate, the most appalling in their consequences for the future seemed to be the problems of the declining areas of the city and countryside, the inadequacy of housing." Percy voted in favor of the Civil Rights Act of 1968 and the confirmation of Thurgood Marshall to the U.S. Supreme Court, joined other Rockefeller Republicans in voting against the Supreme Court nominations of Clement Haynsworth and George Harrold Carswell, but did vote for William Rehnquist in 1971.

When in the Senate less than two years, Percy was mentioned as a Republican hopeful for the 1968 presidential nomination. The New York Times columnist James B. Reston referred to him as "the hottest political article in the Republican Party". In 1970, Percy spoke about his enjoyment of The Autobiography of Malcolm X, saying "Every white person should read it."

In 1972, Percy sought a second term to the Senate. In the general election, he defeated Congressman Roman Pucinski by a landslide. He gave up his seat on the important Senate Appropriations Committee for one on the Foreign Relations Committee.

Senator Percy in 1974 introduced legislation making the  national maximum speed limit permanent, which became law in January 1975, remaining in effect until it was amended in 1987 to allow  on rural Interstate highways and finally repealed in 1995.

In 1978, as Percy was completing his second term, he appeared invincible. Percy was considered so strong that the Democratic Party was unable to persuade any serious candidates to challenge him in that year's election. Alex Seith, a dark horse candidate, was his Democratic challenger. Seith had never before sought elected office but had served as an appointee on the Cook County Zoning Board of Appeals for twelve years, nine as chairman.

At that time, Percy's reputation as a moderate Rockefeller Republican, contrasted with Seith's ostensible hard-line foreign policy positions, combined to make Percy suddenly vulnerable in the weeks before the election. Percy had earlier worked to broaden the base of the Republican Party and was an outlier to more conservative elements. Sensing his probable loss, Percy went on television days before the polling and, with tear-filled eyes, pleaded with Illinois voters to give him another chance. He said, "I got your message and you're right ... I'm sure that I've made my share of mistakes, but your priorities are mine." He won re-election 53% to Seith's 46%.

After the Republicans won control of the Senate in 1980, Percy became chairman of the Foreign Relations Committee. That year he gave a luncheon in honor of the 16th Karmapa of Tibet at the United States Capitol with other Tibetan Buddhists and congressmen. He served in the Senate until the end of his third term in January 1985, after narrowly losing to Congressman Paul Simon in 1984. Critics had accused Percy of paying more attention to foreign affairs than to the domestic issues of his constituents. After Percy's defeat, no Republican would win a senatorial race in Illinois until Peter Fitzgerald in 1998.

In 2006, writing about the influence of political lobbies on the U.S. relationship with Israel, political theorists John Mearsheimer and Stephen Walt wrote that they believed Percy's loss was the result of a campaign waged against him by the American Israel Public Affairs Committee (AIPAC). Earlier that year, Percy and the chairman of the House Foreign Affairs Committee, Dante Fascell, expressed sympathy for the cause of Karl Linnas, a former concentration camp commander who was to be deported from Pennsylvania to Estonia, having lied in the papers he used to enter the United States. Linnas was found to have ordered, and participated in, the murders of Jews and other prisoners. Percy's view, shared by Fascell, Representative Donald L. Ritter of Pennsylvania, and the Helsinki Commission, was that Linnas should be deported, but not to the Soviet Union.

While in the Senate, Percy was active in business and international affairs. Although he explored the possibility of running for president in both 1968 and 1976, he did not run either time. During the early 1970s, he clashed with President Nixon and criticized the U.S. conduct of the Vietnam War.

In 1977, Percy and Sen. Hubert H. Humphrey—responding to the 1973 OPEC oil embargo and high energy prices in general—created the Alliance to Save Energy to encourage a national commitment to energy efficiency. Percy was the founding chairman of the organization.

Percy was mentioned again for the presidency in 1980 and 1988, but his candidacies did not progress beyond the exploratory stage. In 1981, three congressional staffers (Bill Strauss, Elaina Newport, and Jim Aidala) of Percy's Subcommittee on Energy, Nuclear Proliferation, and Government Processes formed the political-satire group the Capitol Steps, which performed for 40 years.

Perhaps Percy's most important act, and his longest-lasting legacy, was ending the practice of nominating federal judges from a pool of candidates generated by the Chicago political machine. He implemented a system of consultation with, and advice from, groups of legal experts, including the professional bar association, a practice considered novel at the time. One of his nominees, John Paul Stevens, was selected by President Gerald Ford as a justice of the United States Supreme Court.

Marriage and family
Percy was a Christian Scientist. During World War II, he married Jeanne Valerie Dickerson.  They had twin daughters, Valerie and Sharon (born 1944) and a son Roger (born 1946). After Jeanne Percy's death in 1947, Percy married Loraine Diane Guyer in 1950.  They had two children: Gail (born 1953) and Mark (born 1955).

One of his twin daughters, Valerie Percy, was murdered at age 21 in her bedroom in the family home in Kenilworth, Illinois, near Chicago, during his senatorial campaign in September 1966. She had been beaten and stabbed to death in her bed while the family was in residence. Although her stepmother had a brief glimpse of the killer and considerable resources were devoted to solving the crime, the identity of the murderer remains unknown.  The wife of a first responder physician to the scene stated in 2016 that her late husband, Dr. Robert Hohf, felt that "the crime scene had been cleaned up" by the time he arrived to the Percy home early on the morning of September 18, 1966.

In 1967 her twin sister Sharon Percy married John D. Rockefeller IV. He became a politician and was later as elected Democratic governor of West Virginia (1977–1985). He served as a United States senator for West Virginia from 1985 until 2015.

Percy remained active after leaving political office but suffered from Alzheimer's disease in later years. He died on September 17, 2011, at the Washington Home and Community Hospice in Washington, D.C. He was interred at Oak Hill Cemetery in Washington, D.C.

Awards
1949 one of 10 outstanding young men of United States Junior Chamber of Commerce
1955 World Trade award World Trade Award Commission
1956 National Sales Executives Management award
1962 Business Man of Year award Saturday Review
1962 Statesmanship award Harvard Business School Association of Chicago
1962 Humanitarian Service award Abraham Lincoln Center
1986 Humanitarian of the Year award Save the Children Fund
1965 Top-Hat award National Federation of Business and Professional Women's Clubs
1965 Business Administration award Drexel Institute
1982 UNICEF World of Children award
Lifetime Achievement Award Alliance to Save Energy
Commander French Legion of Honor

References

External links

Overview of 1984 primary election campaign

Obituary: Charles Percy, Former Illinois Senator, Is Dead", The New York Times, September 18, 2011

|-

|-

|-

|-

1919 births
2011 deaths
American chief executives
American Christian Scientists
United States Navy personnel of World War II
Businesspeople from Chicago
Commandeurs of the Légion d'honneur
Illinois Republicans
Military personnel from Illinois
New Trier High School alumni
Deaths from Alzheimer's disease
Neurological disease deaths in Washington, D.C.
People from Kenilworth, Illinois
People from Pensacola, Florida
Politicians from Chicago
Republican Party United States senators from Illinois
United States Navy officers
University of Chicago alumni
Chairmen of the Senate Committee on Foreign Relations
20th-century American businesspeople
Burials at Oak Hill Cemetery (Washington, D.C.)